The Kenyan Women's Premier League is the top tier women's football league in the Kenyan football league system. It is controlled by the Football Kenya Federation.

History
The first women's football league in Kenya has been created in 1985. In 2010 no league was running any more because of financial problems. UNICEF and the Kenyan government then sponsored the new league. In 2013 the sponsorship was ended, leaving the league unfinished mid-season. In 2014, the league was named FKF Girls' Premier League.

Champions
2010: MYSA Ladies
2011: Unknown
2012: Matuu
2013: season aborted
2014: Oserian (FKF Girls Premier League 2014)
2014–15: Thika Queens
 2016–17: Thika Queens (FKF Women Premier League)
2017: Vihiga Queens (FKF Women Premier League)
2018: Vihiga Queens
2019: Vihiga Queens
2020–21: Thika Queens
2021–22: Vihiga Queens

References

External links
 Kenyan Women's Premier League at Futaa.com

 
1
Kenya
Sports leagues established in 2010
2010 establishments in Kenya